Suru is a village in Kuusalu Parish, Harju County in northern Estonia. It lies on the Valgejõgi River.

References

Villages in Harju County
Kreis Harrien